Dilmurat Mawlanyaz (born 8 April 1998) is a Chinese footballer, currently playing as a defender for Henan Songshan Longmen.

Club career
Dilmurat Mawlanyaz would start his senior career at second tier football club Xinjiang Tianshan Leopard in the 2017 league campaign where he would make his debut in a league game on 24 September 2017 against Meizhou Hakka F.C. in a 3-1 defeat. In the following season he would go on to establish himself as an integral member of the team and played in every league game of the campaign. On 21 February 2019 he signed for top tier club Chongqing Dangdai Lifan.

Career statistics

.

References

External links

1998 births
Living people
Uyghur people
Uyghur sportspeople
Chinese footballers
Chinese people of Uyghur descent
China youth international footballers
Association football defenders
China League One players
Chinese Super League players
Xinjiang Tianshan Leopard F.C. players
Chongqing Liangjiang Athletic F.C. players